David L. Bulova (born May 6, 1969) is an American politician of the Democratic Party. Since 2006 he has been a member of the Virginia House of Delegates. He  represents the 37th district, including the city of Fairfax and part of Fairfax County. He is the son of former Fairfax County Board of Supervisors chairman Sharon Bulova.

Committees 

Bulova serves as Chair of the General Laws Committee and Chair of the Commerce, Agriculture, and Natural Resources Subcommittee in the Appropriations Committee. Additionally, he serves as a member of the Education Committee, Agriculture Chesapeake and Natural Resources and Appropriations Committee.

References

Sources

Delegate David Bulova; Welcome to Virginia's 37th District! (Constituent/campaign website)

External links

1969 births
Living people
Democratic Party members of the Virginia House of Delegates
College of William & Mary alumni
Virginia Tech alumni
People from Fairfax County, Virginia
Politicians from Fairfax, Virginia
21st-century American politicians